ISO/IEC 8859-2:1999, Information technology — 8-bit single-byte coded graphic character sets — Part 2: Latin alphabet No. 2, is part of the ISO/IEC 8859 series of ASCII-based standard character encodings, first edition published in 1987. It is informally referred to as "Latin-2". It is generally intended for Central or "Eastern European" languages that are written in the Latin script. Note that ISO/IEC 8859-2 is very different from code page 852 (MS-DOS Latin 2, PC Latin 2) which is also referred to as "Latin-2" in Czech and Slovak regions. Code page 912 is an extension. Almost half the use of the encoding is for Polish, and it's the main legacy encoding for Polish, while virtually all use of it has been replaced by UTF-8 (on the web).

ISO-8859-2 is the IANA preferred charset name for this standard when supplemented with the C0 and C1 control codes from ISO/IEC 6429. Less than 0.04% of all web pages use ISO-8859-2 as of October 2022. Microsoft has assigned code page 28592 a.k.a. Windows-28592 to ISO-8859-2 in Windows. IBM assigned Code page 1111 to ISO 8859-2.

Windows-1250 is similar to ISO-8859-2 and has all the printable characters it has and more. However a few of them are rearranged (unlike Windows-1252, which keeps all printable characters from ISO-8859-1 in the same place).

Language coverage
These code values can be used for the following languages:

It can also be used for Romanian, but it is not well suited for that language, due to lacking letters s and t with commas below, although it provides s and t with similar-looking cedillas. These letters were unified in the first versions of the Unicode standard, meaning that the appearance with cedilla or with a comma was treated as a glyph choice rather than as separate characters; fonts intended for use with Romanian should therefore, in theory, have characters with a comma below at those code points.

Microsoft did not really provide such fonts for computers sold in Romania. Still, ISO 8859-2 and Windows-1250 (with the same problem) have been heavily used for Romanian. Unicode subsequently disunified the comma variants from the cedilla variants, and has since taken the lead for web pages, which however often have s and t with cedilla anyway. Unicode notes as of 2014 that disunifying the letters with comma below was a mistake, causing corruptions of Romanian data: pre-existing data and input methods would still contain the older cedilla codepoints, complicating text searching.

Code page layout
Differences from ISO-8859-1 have the Unicode code point number underneath.

See also
Character encoding
Polish code pages

References

External links
ISO/IEC 8859-2:1999
Standard ECMA-94: 8-Bit Single Byte Coded Graphic Character Sets - Latin Alphabets No. 1 to No. 4 2nd edition (June 1986)
ISO-IR 101 Right-Hand Part of Latin Alphabet No.2 (February 1, 1986)
ISO 8859-2 (Latin 2) Resources

ISO/IEC 8859
Computer-related introductions in 1987